Aphaenogaster texana is a species of ant in the family Formicidae.

Subspecies
These two subspecies belong to the species Aphaenogaster texana:
 Aphaenogaster texana carolinensis Wheeler, 1915 i c g
 Aphaenogaster texana texana Wheeler, 1915 i c g
Data sources: i = ITIS, c = Catalogue of Life, g = GBIF, b = Bugguide.net

References

Further reading

External links

 

texana
Articles created by Qbugbot
Insects described in 1915